Vipsania was the name of the first wife of Roman emperor Tiberius.

Vapsania may also refer to:

People
 Vipsania gens, a family of equestrian rank in ancient Rome
 Vipsania Polla, sister of Agrippa
 Vipsania (wife of Haterius), wife of Haterius, full sister of Tiberius wife
 Vipsania Marcella, the name of two of Marcus Vipsanius Agrippa's daughters
 Vipsania (wife of Varus), wife of Publius Quinctilius Varus
 Vipsania (wife of Lepidus), wife of Marcus Aemilius Lepidus
 Agrippina the Elder (c. 14 BC – AD 33), mother of emperor Caligula
 Vipsania Julia or Julia the Younger (19 BC – c. AD 29), granddaughter of emperor Augustus

Other uses
 Vipsania unicolora, a moth in Angola

See also
 
 Agrippina (disambiguation)